Irrepetible is a studio album by Puerto Rican salsa music Gilberto Santa Rosa released on June 29, 2010. The album reached #1 on the Tropical Albums and the lead single "Vivir Sin Ti" reached #1 on Latin Tropical Airplay

Album information
According to Santa Rosa, his decision to name the album Irrepitible was he that "never made a bad disc". The album contains guest stars including Latin pop singer Kany García, Johnny Ventura, and veteran salsa singer Rubén Blades. Originally, the album was stated to be an all-duet album but time constraints had forced Santa Rosa to work with those who is close to him. Irrepetible was announced on May 28, 2010. The first single, "Vivir Sin Ti" (To Live Without You), was released on July 6, 2010, and reached #1 on the Latin Tropical Airplay chart. The single did not perform well on the Top Latin Songs peaking at the bottom #50.

Track listing

Reception

Phil Freeman of Allmusic gave the album a four out of five praising the arrangements as "polished".

Chart performance
Irrepetible became a #1 debut on the Tropical Albums on the week of July 17, 2010. For the Top Latin Albums chart, Irrepetible debuted and peaked on #3.

Weekly charts

Year-end charts

Certification

References

Gilberto Santa Rosa albums
2010 albums
Sony Music Latin albums
Spanish-language albums
Latin Grammy Award for Best Salsa Album